is a Japanese manga artist.

Life 
After graduating from Kagoshima Prefectural Ibusuki High School, she attended Tsuru University from where she graduated with a degree in Japanese literature. While still attending Tsuru University, Nishi made her professional manga debut in 1988 with the short story "Matteiru yo" in Shogakukan's manga magazine Petit Flower. After her debut, she stopped publishing manga and was working as an elementary school teacher. Eventually, she took up manga again because of financial reasons. Her definitive works include Sanban-chō Hagiwara-ya no Bijin and Love Song.

Style 
Nishi was inspired by manga artists Fusako Kuramochi and Yoshikazu Yasuhiko.

After completing a draft with pencil, she starts the inking process of her pages using a G pen also for thin lines. She then adds more detailed lines with a Maru pen.

Legacy 
Rachel Thorn described her in the mid-1990s as "one of the most popular and respected artists of her (twenty-something) generation." Her former assistants include Peppe.

Her manga series Otoko no Isshō was nomininated for the Manga Taishō in 2010 and, in the same year, was among the jury-selected works at the Japan Media Arts Festival. She herself has been in the festival's jury for manga from 2019 until 2021.

Works

Sanban-chō Hagiwara-ya no Bijin (三番町萩原屋の美人, 1991-2000)
Love Song (October 1993, Shogakukan)
 Love Song (1998-04-05, Viz Communications)
 STAY (2002-2006)
 Denpa no hito yo (2007)
 Nisan to Boku (2008-2011)
Otoko no Isshō (2008–2012)
Ane no Kekkon (姉の結婚, 2010–2014)
Ta-tan (たーたん, since 2015)
Hatsukoi no Sekai (初恋の世界, since 2016)
Koi to Kokkai (恋と国会, since 2018)

Anthologies
Four Shōjo Stories (February 1996, Viz Communications, two stories)

References

External links
 Keiko Nishi (fan site)
 "Keiko Nishi: Drawn to Manga"  - (J-pop.com)

1966 births
Japanese female comics artists
Female comics writers
Women manga artists
Living people
Manga artists from Kagoshima Prefecture
Japanese women writers